DBO may refer to:

 Database owner (SQL), which can refer to either the physical owner, a user role, or a schema
 Dragon Ball Online
 D-Bo (born 1978), German rapper
 Daulat Beg Oldi
 DBO Energy, an independent Brazilian Oil & Gas company, focused on mature, producing fields
 DB Oil Fund, run by Invesco PowerShares
 Dubbo City Regional Airport
 Dead Blackout (Theatre Lighting)
 The unit dBO, decibels below overload
 Design, build and operate, a type of contract for project delivery and operation